Conospermum undulatum is a shrub in the Proteaceae family, endemic to Western Australia, first described by John Lindley in 1839.

It blooms between May and October producing white flowers.

It is found in a small area in the hills of the Darling Range in Perth in Western Australia where it grows in sandy-clay soils.

This species is listed as vulnerable under the EPBC Act.

References

External links
Conospermum undulatum occurrence data from the Australasian Virtual Herbarium

Eudicots of Western Australia
undulatum
Endemic flora of Western Australia
Plants described in 1839
Taxa named by John Lindley